European Journey is the fifth live release by progressive metal band Threshold. The double album was recorded at various venues across Europe during their 2014 tour. It entered the UK rock chart at no. 22 on 20 November 2015.

Threshold keyboard player Richard West commented on the album: "We had a fantastic tour playing so many fan favorites going back to '97 with 'Part Of The Chaos' through 'Mission Profile', 'Pilot In The Sky Of Dreams' to the present day with 'The Box'. We recorded some shows along the way and it's turned into this really powerful double album".

Track listing

Disc 1
 "Slipstream" – 5:55 (Groom/West)
 "The Hours" – 8:29 (West/Anderson)
 "Liberty Complacency Dependency" – 7:41 (Groom/West)
 "Ground Control" – 7:21 (West)
 "Unforgiven" – 6:20 (Groom/West)
 "Long Way Home" – 6:03 (West/Midson)
 "Part Of The Chaos" – 9:26 (Groom/Jeary/Midson)
 "Coda" – 5:32 (Morten)

Disc 2
 "Watchtower On The Moon" – 5:36 (Groom/West)
 "Pilot In The Sky Of Dreams" – 10:21 (West)
 "Lost In Your Memory" – 4:45 (West)
 "Mission Profile" – 8:43 (Groom/West)
 "The Box" – 12:42 (Groom/West)
 "Turned To Dust" – 4:23 (West)
 "Ashes" – 7:39 (Groom/West)

Personnel

Band members
Damian Wilson - lead vocals
Karl Groom - guitar, backing vocals
Richard West - keyboards, backing vocals
Johanne James - drums
Steve Anderson - bass guitar, backing vocals
Pete Morten - guitar, backing vocals

Production
Produced by Karl Groom and Richard West
Recorded by David Sievers
Mixed and mastered by Karl Groom

References

2015 live albums
Nuclear Blast live albums
Threshold (band) albums